Białoskóry refers to the following places in Poland:

 Białoskóry, Lublin Voivodeship
 Białoskóry, Masovian Voivodeship